Menachem Banitt (born Max Berenblut, July 17, 1914, Antwerp, Belgium, died February 24, 2007, Israel), was a Belgian–Israeli scholar of medieval French culture and language and an internationally acclaimed expert on Rashi. Banitt was particularly known for his analysis of Rashi's occasional translation of words and phrases from Hebrew or Aramaic into Old French, written phonetically in Hebrew letters.

Banitt, who lived for most of his life in Israel, was a recipient of the Israel Prize for the Study of Jewish Languages in 1999. He was also awarded the French honour of Officier of the Ordre des Palmes académiques.

Banitt was credited with writing the articles in the second edition of The Jewish Encyclopedia (2007) on David S. Blondheim, Judeo-French and La'az.

See also
List of Israel Prize recipients

References

Officiers of the Ordre des Palmes Académiques
Writers from Antwerp
Belgian Jews
Belgian emigrants to Israel
Israel Prize in Jewish studies recipients who were historians
1914 births
2007 deaths
Old French
Linguistic history
Historical linguists
Burials at Yarkon Cemetery